Thomas Litz (born March 14, 1945) is a retired American figure skater. He won the gold medal at the 1963 U.S. Figure Skating Championships and placed sixth at the 1964 Winter Olympics.  Litz is credited as being the first skater to land the triple toe loop jump, a feat he accomplished at the 1964 World Figure Skating Championships.

Litz had to withdraw from the 1963 World Figure Skating Championships because of a sprained ankle. He coaches figure skating in Lake Placid, New York.

Results

References

External links

1945 births
Living people
20th-century American people
21st-century American people
American male single skaters
Figure skaters at the 1964 Winter Olympics
Olympic figure skaters of the United States